Jelova gora (Serbian Cyrillic: Јелова гора) is a mountain in western Serbia, between cities of Užice and Bajina Bašta. Its highest peak Jelenina glava has an elevation of 1,011 meters above sea level.

References

Mountains of Serbia